Loud As Feathers is Spy Glass Blue's second full-length studio album. Its sound leans toward a "space rock vibe" with David Bowieesque vocals. HM editor Doug Van Pelt lists the standout tracks as "Light Machine" and "Ophelia".

Track listing
 "Light Machine"
 "Turn and Remember"
 "Because of You"
 "The Dreaming"
 "Morning Star"
 "Everything"
 "Ophelia"
 "(Looks Like) We Made It"
 "Song For My Children"
 "And I Go"

Credits 
Allan Aguirre: Vocals, Keyboard, 12 String Acoustic Guitar, Electric Rhythm & Lead, Percussion
Kane Kelly: Lead and Rhythm Electric Guitar
Kristian Rosentrater: Drums, Percussion, Drum Loops
River Tunnell: 4 and 5 String Bass Guitar
Produced, arranged, and mixed by Allan Aguirre
Assisted by Joshua Pyle

References

2001 albums